Lydia Wideman (later Wideman-Lehtonen, 17 May 1920 – 13 April 2019) was a cross-country skier from Finland and the first female Olympic medalist in cross-country skiing. In 1952 she competed in thirteen 10 km races and won all of them, including the 1952 Winter Olympics, national championships and Lahti Ski Games.

Wideman and her twin sister Tyyne were born in a family of ten siblings. Many members of her family were skilled cross-country skiers. In particular, Tyyne won the national 10 km title in 1949–1951, beating Lydia in 1951, but retiring the same year.

In February 2018, following the death of Durward Knowles, she became the oldest living Olympic champion. She died on 13 April 2019, aged 98.

Cross-country skiing results
All results are sourced from the International Ski Federation (FIS).

Olympic Games

References

External links

 

1920 births
2019 deaths
Cross-country skiers at the 1952 Winter Olympics
Finnish female cross-country skiers
Medalists at the 1952 Winter Olympics
Olympic cross-country skiers of Finland
Olympic medalists in cross-country skiing
Olympic gold medalists for Finland
People from Mänttä-Vilppula
Sportspeople from Pirkanmaa
20th-century Finnish women